The 1993–94 Cypriot Fourth Division was the 9th season of the Cypriot fourth-level football league. Elia Lythrodonta won their 1st title. The winner were promoted to the 1994–95 Cypriot Third Division. The last 5 teams were relegated to regional leagues.

See also
 Cypriot Fourth Division
 1993–94 Cypriot First Division
 1993–94 Cypriot Cup

Cypriot Fourth Division seasons
Cyprus
1993–94 in Cypriot football